The following is a list of anti-materiel rifles: sniper rifles that fire large caliber ammunition used primarily for engaging materiel, rather than personnel.

References 

Anti-materiel rifles